Santiago Metro Line 6 is a line on the Santiago Metro, Santiago, Chile. It connects the commune of Cerrillos, in the south west of the city, with Providencia in the east of the city, where most economic activity is concentrated. It has 10 new stations on 15.3 km of track.

The main purposes of Line 6 is to relieve the saturated Line 1 and to provide extra connections across the Santiago transport network. The line connects with Line 1, Line 2, Line 3 and Line 5, with the suburban train network (Metrotrén) at Lo Valledor station, and with the Transantiago bus network at Avenida Pedro Aguirre Cerda, Avenida Departamental, Avenida Santa Rosa and Avenida Grecia. It is also hoped that the line will incentivise development in the south central area of the capital city.

The line directly benefits the communes of Cerrillos, Estación Central, Pedro Aguirre Cerda, Santiago, San Miguel, San Joaquín, Ñuñoa, Providencia and Las Condes.

It was inaugurated on November 2, 2017, by President Michelle Bachelet.

History

The project was announced by Chilean president Michelle Bachelet in 2009. In January 2012 a modification to the original track plan was announced, with the “Maestranza” (renamed as “Lo Valledor”) and “Club Hípico” stations relocated on Avenida Carlos Valdovinos.

However, on December 22, 2017, as a result of the announcement of the construction of the new Line 7, the lengthening of Line 6 from the Los Leones station to the future Isidora Goyenechea station is confirmed, with which both lines will remain connected.

Initial criticisms

Mayors of some of the wealthier communes in the east of the city have criticised the project, claiming that insufficient consultation had taken place before it was announced. Other critics complained about further delays in the construction of Line 3, whose completion date was pushed back in favour of Line 6.

Technical studies carried out by the Catholic University of Chile claimed that Line 6 has several advantages over Line 3, primarily because of its greater social impact and the potential for development it brings to derelict areas of the city.

Innovations

The new metro lines (Line 3 and Line 6) are expected to comply with high security and passenger comfort standards. The new security measures will include cameras inside the trains, an overhead electric transmission line, auto-drive, doors located on the platform, air conditioning in the trains and connections with suburban trains.

Line 6 suffered the least amount of damage from the October 2019 protests, but was nevertheless closed on the weekend of October 18, 2019 due to security issues. Service on Line 6 was partially restored on October 23, and all stations were reopened by the end of the year.

Communes served by Line 6

Line 6 serves the following Santiago communes from west to east:
 
Cerrillos
Estación Central
Pedro Aguirre Cerda
Santiago
San Miguel
San Joaquín
Ñuñoa
Providencia

Stations
Although the trains of the line 6 are composed of 5 cars, the stations are designed for 6-car trainsets.

Line 6 stations, from west to east, are:

Line 6 data sheet
 Terminus communes: Cerrillos and Providencia
 Track:
 Camino a Melipilla Avenue
 Carlos Valdovinos Avenue
 Isabel Riquelme Avenue
 Placer avenue
 Carlos Dittborn Avenue
 Pedro de Valdivia Avenue
 Avenida Providencia Avenue
 Vitacura Avenue
 Construction Method:
 Underground
 Opening Dates:
 November 2, 2017

See also 
 List of metro systems
 Rail transport in Chile
 Transantiago

References

External links
 Metro S.A.
 UrbanRail.net/Santiago
 Santiago Metro Track Map
 Tarjeta Bip!
 Plan and Authority of Transit of Santiago de Chile, Transantiago